Carlos Mazure from the SOITEC, Bernin, France was named Fellow of the Institute of Electrical and Electronics Engineers (IEEE) in 2013 for leadership in the field of silicon on insulator and memory technologies.

References

Fellow Members of the IEEE
Living people
Year of birth missing (living people)
Place of birth missing (living people)